Spider-Man vs. The Kingpin is a video game produced by Sega of America and developed by Technopop initially on the Mega Drive/Genesis. It was ported internally by Sega of America for the Master System and Game Gear consoles, the latter being published by Acclaim Entertainment through its Flying Edge division. An updated version was also released for the Sega CD under the name of The Amazing Spider-Man vs. The Kingpin.

All versions of the video game are side-scrolling platform games, whereby the player controls superhero Spider-Man to battle various supervillains (Doctor Octopus, Sandman, The Lizard, Hobgoblin, Vulture, Mysterio, Electro, and Venom) to obtain the keys needed to disarm a nuclear bomb that the Kingpin has not only framed Spider-Man for stealing but plans to detonate within twenty-four hours. In the middle of the game, Spider-Man's wife Mary Jane Watson is also kidnapped by Venom.

Plot
A few weeks after becoming Spider-Man, Peter Parker becomes married to Mary Jane Watson. Meanwhile, Kingpin establishes a criminal empire and forcefully transforms respected scientist Otto Octavious into Doctor Octopus. Peter reveals his identity to Mary Jane, who accepts. The two are then attacked by Doctor Octopus, who claims to want to know more information about Spider-Man (and is searching for Peter due to him taking photos of Spider-Man). Peter defeats Doctor Octopus, who reveals himself to be Octavious and apologizes for his crimes. Peter is then attacked by a thug named Flint Marko, who he defeats easily, though Marko is picked up by one of Fisk’s helicopters. Fisk gains help from scientist Curt Connors, intended to be a replacement for Octavious, and transforms Marko into Sandman. Elsewhere, Mary Jane is kidnapped by Bugle reporter Eddie Brock, who has bonded to the Venom symbiote. Spider-Man defeats Sandman, but is phoned by Kingpin, who says he has employee Venom and has captured Mary Jane. Curt Connors attempts to increase Venom’s power, but fails. Kingpin injects him with an artificial serum and he becomes Lizard. Spider-Man attempts to find Kingpin’s hideout, but is stalked and captured by Lizard. Spider-Man complies to his capture, so he can get closer to Kingpin. Before they get to Kingpin’s hideout, Spider-Man injects Connors with an antidote, causing him to return to his normal form. Peter attempts to get to Kingpin’s hideout on his own using a GPS on Lizard. On his way, he is captured by a mysterious man, who refers to himself as Hobgoblin. Hobgoblin speaks of his rivalry with Kingpin, and gives his assistance in charge for Spider-Man’s cooperation. Spider-Man grudgingly complies, and the two get to Kingpin’s headquarters. The while inside Kingpin’s hideout, Kingpin reveals to Spider-Man via hologram that Hobgoblin was working for him the whole time. Hobgoblin unmasks as Harry Osborn. The two battle and Spider-Man comes out on top. Angered, Kingpin sends his three most powerful mercenaries, Vulture, Mysterio, and Electro. The three fight on a plane, with Vulture and Spider-Man being the last ones standing. Angered, Vulture cuts open the plane’s engine. Spider-Man manages to save Vulture and the passengers. Vulture reforms, but Spider-Man is attacked by Venom and Kingpin. Spider-Man fights them both at once, but is defeated. Meanwhile, Mary Jane manages to escape. In the wreckage of the plane, Spider-Man passes out, but is woken up by a reformed Octavious, Connors, and Harry Osborn as Hobgoblin. The three defeat Venom, but Kingpin sends out hundreds of criminals to plague New York. Vulture manages to help Spider-Man get into the centre of New York. Hobgoblin injects Venom with a gene cleanser, removing the Venom from his body. Kingpin, angered, retreats, swearing revenge. In an epilogue sequence, Mary Jane and Peter marry in a happy ceremony, Fisk is exposed and imprisoned, and Peter is named Daily Bugle’s employee of the month. Later, J. Jonah Jameson reads a newspaper about Spider-Man and smirks. Meanwhile, in a distant sewer, Venom stumbles through a sewer and collapses, with the Venom symbiote escaping.

Ports

Mega Drive/Genesis version
The Sega Mega Drive version was released in 1991 and was widely popular with comic book fans, helping to establish the success of the 16-bit Mega Drive/Genesis system. Critics noted that the game had superior graphics, sound and faithfully recreated the characters for the video game universe, even allowing the player to take pictures of the major and minor enemies in the video game to sell at the Daily Bugle to buy more web fluid. The additional ultra-hard challenge was a fight with Venom at the end of each round, before reaching the actual boss. In addition to Venom, there are also many other popular Spider-Man villains that player would have to fight, such as Doctor Octopus, Lizard, Electro, Mysterio, Sandman and Hobgoblin.

According to developer Randel B. Reiss, this version was a huge commercial success: two thirds of all Mega Drive owners at the time also bought the game, and single-handedly convinced Marvel Comics not to cancel the licensing deal they had with Sega.

Master System / Game Gear version
The 8-bit Sega Master System version is noted as one of the last Master System games officially sold in North America. Like other Master System games released in the United States in 1991, it is European imports that were published by Sega of America, as no boxes or manuals were produced for the American market. The game had the same basic format and storyline as the 16-bit version, with redesigned levels, cutscenes (that included a cameo from Doctor Strange) and even on the easiest setting was seen as being difficult to complete. In this version Mary Jane would not be kidnapped but still appear at the end of the game if players attain the best ending.

A nearly identical port was also released for the Sega Game Gear portable system.

Mega-CD/Sega CD version
The 16-bit Mega-CD/Sega CD version (1993) made several improvements to game to take advantage of extra memory capabilities of the CD-ROM system. Animated scenes, with voice actors, were added to move the story along and to show what happened when the player died. Gameplay was sped up in this version; Spider-Man could move and climb surfaces significantly faster than in the Mega Drive version. The game also added two new levels, extra combat moves, the ability to collect reproductions of famous Spider-Man comic books issues, and an original musical score by Spencer Nilsen and rock band Mr. Big. The game also was more non-linear as the player could venture to various locations throughout the city (including a local television station). However, the ability to take pictures during the game in order to earn money for web fluid was taken out of this version. The game also added two new levels (Mysterio's Funhouse and the Vulture in the subway). In addition, before battling the Evil Kingpin, the player must first defeat Bullseye and Typhoid Mary. The game had three different difficulty levels (easy, normal and nightmare) and a contest was held (details were provided in the instructions manual along with a sheet to mail in) to see who could successfully complete the game in the ultra-hard nightmare mode and collect all 21 comic book covers.

Alternative endings
In the final level of the Mega-CD and Mega Drive games, Spider-Man must defeat Kingpin before Mary Jane is dropped into a pit of acid. The Mega-CD version features some alternate cutscenes depending on the outcome of this level. If the player beats Kingpin, but not in time to save Mary Jane from falling into the acid pit, the police will arrest Kingpin and Spider-Man angrily vows to avenge Mary Jane. If the player fails to defeat Kingpin (or his bodyguards), Spider-Man and Mary Jane will be tied up and lowered into the acid pit together. The Mega Drive version is similar, only Kingpin will escape once Mary Jane is killed, leaving a heartbroken Spider-Man on his knees.

In the Master System version, Mary Jane doesn't get kidnapped. If the player loses or flees the final battle, though, Kingpin will get away.

Reception

Legacy

The Sega CD version of the game and its additional "Mysterio's FunHouse" level inspired a similar level in the Xbox, PS2, and Gamecube versions of the 2004 game Spider-Man 2, developed by Treyarch. Mysterio was included in the game in part as an intended homage to Spider-Man vs. The Kingpin.

References

External links

1991 video games
Sega video games
Game Gear games
Master System games
Sega Genesis games
Sega CD games
Video games about bomb disposal
Video games based on Spider-Man
Video games developed in Canada
Video games developed in the United States
Video games with alternate endings
Video games scored by David Young
Video games scored by Spencer Nilsen
Video games set in New York City
Side-scrolling platform games
Action video games
Superhero video games
Single-player video games